Desmond Thomas Devenish is an English-American filmmaker, producer, and writer.

Early life 

Devenish was born in Manhattan, New York City to Louise Devenish (née Mellion), appraiser and professor of fine and decorative arts and Thomas Devenish, a New York dealer of fine English furniture, born in England to parents who were vaudevillians. 

Among the schools Devenish attended were Saint David's School (New York City), Riverdale Country School, John F. Kennedy High School (New York City), Tisch School of the Arts at New York University, Marymount Manhattan College, where he received his BA in Theatre Arts, and The Los Angeles Film School.

Personal life
Devenish resides in Malibu, California.

Theatre 
Devenish performed in the Broadway production of On the Waterfront at The Brooks Atkinson Theatre, which starred Ron Eldard, Penelope Ann Miller, David Morse and James Gandolfini.

Film 
While still in high school, Devenish landed the lead role in Delinquent, directed by Peter Hall. He also starred in Exit 8A which ran at Sundance and The LA Film Festival.

As a filmmaker, his LA Film School thesis, Split, was acquired by Shorts International. His second short Closure won best short at San Pedro International Film Festival. Devenish's feature film directorial debut, Misfortune, a gritty thriller shot in Tucson, Arizona won the Yellow Rose at Jaipur International Film Festival, best feature at Black Hills Film Festival, and was nominated for the Grand Jury Award at Dances With Films. Misfortune was theatrically released in a dozen U.S. markets, and is distributed by Entertainment One.

Eddie & Sunny, Devenish's sophomore feature, which stars Gabriel Luna and Joanna Vanderham, centers on an impulsive loving homeless family, who commit a cartel-related homicide, leaving them and their child fugitives in pursuit of safe harbor. Silvio Muraglia and Andrea Iervolino have helmed on producing the project, filmed in Ostia, Italy and Guatemala.

Television 
Stretch It Out!, a comedy special, written and performed by Shawn Pelofsky and directed by Devenish, is distributed by Comedy Dynamics.

Books

Stage

Filmography

Film

References

External links
Official website
 
 

Year of birth missing (living people)
Living people
Tisch School of the Arts alumni
People from Manhattan
Marymount Manhattan College alumni
Riverdale Country School alumni